Jiggs may refer to:

Animals
 Jiggs (chimpanzee), who originated the role of Cheeta in the Tarzan movies
 Jiggs (orangutan), held in the Universal City Zoo and San Diego Zoo in the early 20th century
 Jiggs II, the second of a number of English Bulldogs to serve as mascots of the United States Marine Corps

Communities
 Jiggs, Nevada, an unincorporated community in Elko County

People

Nickname

Military figures
 Frank Borland (1925–2013), Canadian Second World War soldier, recipient of the French Legion of Honor
 C. H. Jaeger (1913–1970), British Army lieutenant colonel and military band leader

Sportspeople
 George "Jiggs" Dahlberg, head coach of the 1945 Montana Grizzlies football team
 Edward Donahue (c. 1891–1961), American multi-sport college athlete, coach and administrator
 Jiggs Donahue (1879–1913), American professional baseball player
 John Donahue (baseball) (1894–1949), American professional baseball player
 Jiggs McDonald (born 1938), Canadian hockey sportscaster
 Jiggs Parrott (1871–1898), American professional baseball player
 Jiggs Parson (1885–1967), American professional baseball pitcher
 Jiggs Peters, race car driver in the 1954 AAA Championship Car season, among others
 Don Peterson (American football) (1928–2010), American college football player

Other
 Jiggs Kalra (1947–2019), Indian restaurateur, food columnist, television host, and author
 Jiggs Whigham (born 1943), American jazz trombonist

Fictional characters
 Jiggs, star of American comic strip Bringing Up Father, with his wife Maggie, from 1913 to 2000
 Jiggs and Maggie (film series), a series of films with those characters, from 1946 to 1950
 Jiggs, a major character in the 1935 novel Pylon by William Faulkner
 Colonel Martin "Jiggs" Casey, in the 1964 film Seven Days in May, played by Kirk Douglas
 Jillian Jiggs, in children's books by Phoebe Gilman
 Master Sergeant Jiggs, Chief of Security for Project Tic-Toc in the Irwin Allen Television Series The Time Tunnel, portrayed by Wesley Lau

Other
 Jiggs dinner, a traditional meal commonly prepared and eaten on Sundays in Newfoundland

See also
 
 Jig (disambiguation)

Lists of people by nickname